Lula Hymes Glenn (1917-2016) was an American track and field athlete who tied the world record time for the 100-meter dash at 11.5 seconds in 1939. She was considered one of the fastest women in the world at the height of her athletic career.

Biography
Glenn née Hymes was born in Atlanta, Georgia in 1917. She attended Booker T. Washington High School. She then attended the Tuskegee Institute on a track scholarship.

In 1937 Glenn earned three gold medals in national competitions. In 1939 she tied the world record time for the 100-meter dash at 11.5 seconds. In 1940 she was called "America’s greatest girl track and field athlete" by the Atlanta Constitution. Glenn was the contemporary of two other notable Tuskegee women athletes, Leila Perry Glover and Alice Coachman Davis.

Because of her outstanding collegiate career Glenn was favored to win a gold medal at the Olympics in 1940. However the 1940 games were cancelled due to the outbreak of World War II. The 1944 games were cancelled as well and Glenn chose not to compete in the 1948 games.

Glenn became a teacher after she graduated from the Tuskegee Institute. She taught Home Economics and Physical Education. In 1974 she became a member of the Tuskegee University Athletic Hall of Fame.

Glenn died in Auburn, Georgia in 2016. Glenn is included in "Black Women in America: An Historical Encyclopedia".

References

1917 births
2016 deaths
African-American sportswomen
African-American female track and field athletes
People from Atlanta
Tuskegee University alumni
USA Outdoor Track and Field Championships winners
20th-century African-American sportspeople
21st-century African-American people
20th-century African-American women
20th-century African-American people
21st-century African-American women